Lionello is a given name. Notable people with the name include:

Given name:
Lionello Bononi, Italian of the Baroque period
Lionello Cecil (1893–1957), Australian operatic tenor
Lionello d'Este (1407–1450), marquis of Ferrara and Duke of Modena and Reggio Emilia from 1441 to 1450
Lionello Grifo (born 1934), Italian poet and writer
Lionello Levi Sandri (1910–1991), Italian politician and European Commissioner
Lionello Manfredonia (born 1956), Italian former footballer
Lionello Spada (1576–1622), Italian painter of the Baroque period

Surname:
Alberto Lionello (1930–1994), Italian film actor
Luca Lionello (born 1964), Italian actor
Oreste Lionello (1927–2009), Italian actor and voice dubbing artist

it:Lionello